Jakub Chleboun (born 24 March 1985) is a Czech football player who currently plays for TJ Sokol České Heřmanice.

References

 Profile at iDNES.cz (Czech)

External links
 Profile at ČMFS website
 Guardian Football

1985 births
Living people
Czech footballers
Czech Republic youth international footballers
Czech First League players
Kazakhstan Premier League players
SK Slavia Prague players
FC Hradec Králové players
FC Akzhayik players
FC Irtysh Pavlodar players
Czech expatriate footballers
Expatriate footballers in Kazakhstan

Association football defenders